Robert J. McConachie was an English footballer who played in the Football League for The Wednesday. McConachie's only appearance for Wednesday came in a 1–0 defeat at Stoke on 1 April 1893.

References

Date of birth unknown
Date of death unknown
English footballers
Association football forwards
English Football League players
Sheffield Wednesday F.C. players